
Year 21 BC was either a common year starting on Monday, Tuesday or Wednesday or a leap year starting on Tuesday (link will display the full calendar) of the Julian calendar (the sources differ, see leap year error for further information) and a leap year starting on Sunday of the Proleptic Julian calendar. At the time, it was known as the Year of the Consulship of Lollius and Lepidus (or, less frequently, year 733 Ab urbe condita). The denomination 21 BC for this year has been used since the early medieval period, when the Anno Domini calendar era became the prevalent method in Europe for naming years.

Events 
 By place 

 Roman Empire 
 Marcus Vipsanius Agrippa divorces Claudia Marcella Major, and marries Julia the Elder, daughter of Caesar Augustus.

Births 
 Naevius Sutorius Macro, Roman prefect and politician (d. AD 38)

Deaths

References